Chechi is a village located at  in west from capital of Pakistan, Islamabad on Grand Trunk Road in Attock District of Punjab, Pakistan.

Location
Chechi is located at the edge of Khyber-Pakhtunkhwa-Punjab. It is located 20 kilometres north from Attock City and 80 kilometres east from Peshawar. The region came under Islamic rule in 1001 after Battle of Peshawar.

Community
The vast majority of people speak Hindko. Pashto is another language which is predominantly spoken. The village gets its name from the Chechi clan of the Gujjar tribe. The population of Chechi consists of  Gujjars, Pathans, Awans, Mughals as well as a few other ethnic groups.

References

Villages in Attock District